Pionerskoye is a rural locality on Karelian Isthmus, in Vyborgsky District of Leningrad Oblast, Russia. Until the Winter War and Continuation War, it had been the administrative center of the Kuolemajärvi municipality of the Viipuri province of Finland.

External links
http://www.kuolemajarvi.fi 

Rural localities in Leningrad Oblast
Karelian Isthmus